The Arctic Policy of China outlines China's approach to foreign relations with Arctic countries as well as its plans to develop infrastructure, extend military capabilities, conduct research, and excavate resources within the Arctic Circle. A major component of this plan is to build a Polar Silk Road, a network of trade routes through the Arctic to help expedite global shipping delivery.

In January 2018, China released its official Arctic Policy paper. The document draws a picture of how China views the economic possibilities the region offers. With this, China has vowed to actively participate in Arctic affairs as a "Near-Arctic State" and a major stakeholder in the Arctic. China has also focused on developing military projection capabilities that would extend into the Arctic region.

Background
With global warming and the melting of polar ice caps, more resources will be open for exploration and exploitation, leading to increased interest in investment in the region.

Near-Arctic states 
Interest in the Arctic region is not limited to littoral states, as many non-Arctic countries have been admitted as members or observers at the Arctic Council, including France, Germany, Italy, the Netherlands, Poland, Spain, the United Kingdom, Japan, South Korea, Singapore, India and China. China has been steadily affirming its presence in the region, in 2018 declaring itself a "near-Arctic state". Meanwhile, the debate among scholars, media and the public is still ongoing as to what is its rightful place in the Arctic. The only unanimity among public voices appears to be that the Arctic belongs to humankind and not to any one country or group of countries.

On the term "near-Arctic" a report clarifies that China is "one of the continental States that are closest to the Arctic Circle."

History of China-Arctic relations 
In 1925 China signed the Spitsbergen Treaty, which allows signatories' commercial activities on Svalbard. Early Chinese media discussion of foreign nuclear missiles over Svalbard broadened in the 1980s to the Arctic's mineral, fishing, and transportation potential.

Some of the earliest scientific involvements are the Polar Research Institute of China of Shanghai, whose initial field research date from the late 1980s, as the well as the creation of the Chinese Journal of Polar Research by the Academy of Sciences in 1988. The first expedition took place in 1984 and there have been 26 in total (as of 2011).

In 1996 China joined the International Arctic Science Committee.

Since 1999 it has launched a series of research vessels including the Xue Long.

In 2004 China built the Arctic Yellow River station.

In 2010, Chinese leaders promote cautious Arctic policies so as to not provoke negative responses from the Arctic states. At the same time China is trying to position itself not to be excluded from access to the Arctic. China appears particularly wary of Russia's Arctic intentions. Chinese observers have noted Russia's decision to resume bomber flights over the Arctic and the planting of a Russian flag on the Arctic seabed, both in August 2007.

In March, 2012, there was no authoritative statement of policy from the Chinese government on the Arctic, although Chinese scientists and academics increasingly are active in the region, and suggesting policies for the nation.

In August 2012, Xuě Lóng became the first Chinese vessel to traverse the Northeast Passage. A second Chinese icebreaker is slated for launch in 2014.

In May 2013, China becomes an observer of the Arctic Council.

In 2014, Chinese Communist Party general secretary Xi Jinping declared that China should become a "great power".

In 2018, COSCO made eight transits through the Arctic between Europe and China. Several of these were done by the Tian Hui, Tian You and Tian En.

Goals 
According to their official policy paper, China's goals are "to understand, protect, develop and participate in the governance of the Arctic, so as to safeguard the common interests of all countries and the international community in the Arctic, and promote sustainable development of the Arctic."

Interest in Arctic resources
In March 2010, Chinese Rear Admiral Yin Zhuo famously said: "The Arctic belongs to all the people around the world, as no nation has sovereignty over it... China must plan an indispensable role in Arctic exploration as we have one-fifth of the world’s population". Between 88 and 95% of resources in the Arctic fall within one of the five Arctic Ocean coastal states' Exclusive Economic Zones (EEZ's) and China is unlikely to challenge the provision within the Law of the Sea that creates the EEZ's. This, coupled with Chinese companies lack of Arctic expertise, suggest that China will partner with Arctic nations in resource extraction rather than act alone. China's near-term Arctic focus is on liquified natural gas, which the region may have 30% of undiscovered supplies of.

Arctic research 
China spends about as much as South Korea on Arctic research (much more than the United States).

China is engaged in research on "Arctic geology, geography, ..., hydrology, meteorology, sea ice, biology, ecology, geophysics and marine chemistry. It monitors "local climatic and environmental changes" and collects data on "bio-ecological character and environmental quality". It also focuses on constructing "cooperative research (observation) stations" as well as making the icy waters easier to navigate via things like icebreakers.

Xuelong 

The Xuelong or "Snow Dragon" is one such icebreaker vessel that conducts sundry geoscientific research. The Xuelong 2 is expected to hit waters in 2019. It is China's first homebuilt icebreaker. China plans to develop next a nuclear-powered icebreaker, to become the second country after Russia to do so.

Joint efforts with Iceland 
The Polar Institute of China in collaboration with Iceland institutions opened the China-Iceland Arctic Science Observatory in northern Iceland.

Polar Silk Road 
China plans to build new shipping routes through the Arctic via the Silk Road Economic Belt and Maritime Silk Road. It is a joint Chinese-Russian initiative that was launched in 2018 as the "Polar Silk Road", a name first mentioned by a Russian minister at a 2011 meeting. International sanctions during the Russo-Ukrainian War caused Russia to seek Chinese technological and financial aid to develop the Yamal-Nenets region.

Arctic shipping routes
Among Arctic shipping routes, the maritime shipping distance from Shanghai to Hamburg is about 4,000 miles shorter via the Northeast Passage than the southern route through the Strait of Malacca and the Suez Canal. A long-term goal for China is the Northern Sea Route, which by 2030 may be fully ice free—earlier than the Northwest Passage or Transpolar Sea Route—shortening shipping distance from China to the Netherlands by 23%. The route would reduce China's dependence on the Southern Sea Route, which has several chokepoints aligned with the United States. China has the largest foreign embassy in Reykjavik, anticipating Iceland becoming an important transhipment hub.

Chinese Arctic experts have pointed out the limitations of Arctic sea routes, including harsh conditions, more icebergs due to melting of Greenland's icecap, higher insurance premiums, lack of infrastructure and shallow depths.

China has remained neutral on Canada's position that the Northwest Passage is in Canada's internal waters.

Environment and climate change 
China has stated that another one of their goals is to help protect the eco-environment and combat climate change in the region. This also includes conserving "living resources" including fisheries.

Developing tourism 
China wishes to raise the "environmental awareness" of Chinese tourists in the region to promote low-carbon emissions.

Contributing to Arctic governance 
China aims to cooperate with other international players and Arctic states to promote "peace and stability" in the region. China supports “The Arctic: Territory of Dialogue”, “The Arctic Circle”, “Arctic Frontiers”, “The China-Nordic Arctic Research Center”.

Arctic Council permanent observer status
China has been an observer of the Arctic Council since May 2013. At the 2009 ministerial meeting in Tromsø, China requested Permanent Observer status. The request was denied at least partly because members could not agree on the role of Observer States. In 2011, the Arctic Council clarified its criteria for admission of observers, most notably including a requirement of applicants to "recognize Arctic States’ sovereignty, sovereign rights and jurisdiction in the Arctic" and "recognize that an extensive legal framework applies to the Arctic Ocean including, notably, the Law of the Sea, and that this framework provides a solid foundation for responsible management of this ocean". China's request was approved at the next Arctic Council ministerial meeting in May 2013. Permanent observer status would allow presentation of their perspective, but not voting.

Assessment 
According to the Diplomat, 'as an Arctic stakeholder, China's position has evolved from being a “passive rule-follower” to becoming a regional “rule-maker.”'

The white paper affirms China's commitment to upholding international law while promoting internationalization of Arctic governance, to extend to quasi-Arctic states as well. As stated in the paper, China seeks to extend its Belt and Road Initiative to the Arctic as well.

See also

Silk Road Economic Belt
Arctic cooperation and politics
Chinese Arctic and Antarctic Administration
Polar Research Institute of China
Arctic Yellow River Station
Xuě Lóng
Arctic Council

References

External links
 Naval War College - China Maritime Studies Institute: The Dragon Eyes the Top of the World
 China’s Growing Arctic Interest - East Asian Institute, NUS
 China and the Arctic: Objectives and Obstacles - U.S.-China Economic and Security Review Commission, April 13, 2012
 From ‘Great Wall’ to ‘Great White North’: Explaining China’s politics in the Arctic - European Geostrategy - August 17, 2012

Foreign relations of China
China